Biotodoma is a small genus of cichlids native to rivers in the Amazon, Orinoco and Essequibo basins in South America.

Species
There are two currently recognized species in the genus, but additional cryptic species are known to exist.

 Biotodoma cupido (Heckel, 1840) (green-streaked eartheater)
 Biotodoma wavrini (J. P. Gosse, 1963) (Orinoco eartheater)

References
 

 
Geophagini
Cichlid genera
Taxa named by Carl H. Eigenmann